KXIX is a commercial top 40 (CHR) music radio station in Sunriver, Oregon, broadcasting on 94.1 FM.

External links
Official Website

XIX
XIX
Contemporary hit radio stations in the United States
Radio stations established in 2006
2006 establishments in Oregon